Fraser Kingnan is a Scottish curler from Dumfries. He is a former World Junior silver medallist and represented Scotland at the 2018 World Mixed Doubles Curling Championship.

Kingan began curling at around 2006. He won the 2017 Scottish Mixed Doubles Curling Championship, earning him and partner Jayne Stirling the right to represent Scotland at the 2018 World Mixed Doubles Curling Championship. There, the pair went 6–1 in the round robin, before losing to Japan in the round of 16, but won their next three placement games to finish 9th overall. . Earlier that year, he also won the 2018 Scottish Junior Men's Championship, and played on the Scottish team at the 2018 World Junior Curling Championships on home ice in Aberdeen. Playing second for the team, skipped by Ross Whyte, Scotland won a silver medal.

Kingan has had most of his success in the mixed doubles discipline. On the World Curling Tour, he has won the 2018 International Mixed Doubles Dumfries and the Latvian Mixed Doubles Curling Cup 2 with Stirling.

References

External links

Living people
Scottish male curlers
Sportspeople from Dumfries
Year of birth missing (living people)